
Gmina Maków is a rural gmina (administrative district) in Skierniewice County, Łódź Voivodeship, in central Poland.

Villages
Gmina Maków contains the villages and settlements of Dąbrowice, Jacochów, Krężce, Maków, Maków-Kolonia, Pszczonów, Sielce Lewe, Sielce Prawe, Słomków, Święte Laski, Święte Nowaki and Wola Makowska.

Neighbouring gminas
Gmina Maków is bordered by the city of Skierniewice and by the gminas of Godzianów, Lipce Reymontowskie, Łyszkowice and Skierniewice.

References
Polish official population figures 2006

Makow
Skierniewice County